KPAT (95.7 FM, "95.7 The Beat") is a commercial radio station that is licensed to Santa Maria, California, United States and serves the Santa Maria—Lompoc area. The station is owned by American General Media and broadcasts a rhythmic contemporary format.

History
The station first signed on in 1994 as KGDP-FM with a rhythmic oldies format. By the end of the 1990s, KGDP-FM featured Southern gospel music.

On March 24, 1999, KGDP-FM changed its call sign to KPAT. (Previously, the KPAT call letters belonged to a station in Sioux Falls, South Dakota, now known as KKRC-FM, from 1973 to 1994.) In November, Radio Representatives Inc., based in Los Osos, California, sold KPAT to American General Media for $900,000.

KPAT adopted a rhythmic contemporary format in 2004.

On January 18, 2010 at 11:30 a.m., high winds in the Santa Maria area triggered a power outage that knocked KPAT off the air. The station resumed broadcasting one hour later under generator power.

References

External links

PAT
Rhythmic contemporary radio stations in the United States
American Basketball Association flagship radio stations
Radio stations established in 1994
1994 establishments in California